Harold Sidney Aylwin (16 December 1870 – 1 June 1949) was an Australian rules footballer who played with St Kilda in the Victorian Football League (VFL).

He later had a successful business career as head of the Australian business for J. & N. Philips.

References

External links 

1870 births
1949 deaths
VFL/AFL players born outside Australia
St Kilda Football Club players
Australian rules footballers from Victoria (Australia)